The Dominican Summer League Red Sox, often called the DSL Red Sox, are a Minor League Baseball affiliate of the Boston Red Sox of Major League Baseball, playing in the foreign Dominican Summer League. The team, classed as a Rookie League franchise, plays at the El Toro Complex in the Dominican Republic.

For the 2021 Boston Red Sox season, the field coordinator is José Zapata, and the Red Sox are fielding two teams; one managed by Ozzie Chavez and the other managed by Sandy Madera.

History
The Red Sox have fielded at least one team in the DSL each season since 1996; the team that season was a cooperative with the Houston Astros. Since 1997, the Red Sox have fielded their own team. In some seasons, the Red Sox have fielded two teams in the league. This first occurred in 2003, when the Venezuelan general strike of 2002–03 impacted the Venezuelan Summer League, where the Red Sox also had an affiliate. The Red Sox have fielded two DSL teams each season since 2015, except for 2017. When two teams are fielded, they are distinguished by the suffixes 1 and 2, or Blue and Red (e.g. DSL Red Sox 1). In 2022, both Red Sox teams competed in the same division.

The Red Sox fielded a cooperative team with one or more other MLB clubs several times: 1989 with the Baltimore Orioles and Milwaukee Brewers; 1990 with the Detroit Tigers and San Diego Padres; 1996 with the Astros; 2000 with the Arizona Diamondbacks; and 2001 with the Cleveland Indians.

The DSL Red Sox reached the league championship series in 2014, and DSL Red Sox 1 won the league championship series in 2016.

Notable alumni include Hanley Ramírez, who played with the team in 2001, Xander Bogaerts, who hit .314 with the team during the 2010 season, and Rafael Devers, who hit .337 with the team during the 2014 season.

Results by year

Cooperative teams

Red Sox teams

Notes:
 Finish position is within the team's division.
 Records of the 1997 through 2004 seasons are incomplete on Baseball-Reference.com.

Roster

See also
Notable DSL Red Sox players

Notes

References

External links
 DSL Red Sox Blue at MiLB.com
 DSL Red Sox Red at MiLB.com

Baseball teams established in 1997
Baseball teams in the Dominican Republic
Boston Red Sox minor league affiliates
Dominican Summer League teams
1997 establishments in the Dominican Republic